Lieutenant-Colonel William Rennie VC (1 November 1821 – 22 August 1896) was a Scottish recipient of the Victoria Cross, the highest and most prestigious award for gallantry in the face of the enemy that can be awarded to British and Commonwealth forces.

Details
Rennie was 34 years old, and a lieutenant and adjutant in the 90th Regiment of Foot (later The Cameronians (Scottish Rifles), British Army during the Indian Mutiny when the following deeds took place at the siege of Lucknow for which he was awarded the VC:

Further information
Lieutenant Rennie was promoted to captain on 9 January 1863, major 10 December 1873, lieutenant-colonel 28 March 1874 and retired in 1875. He died at Elgin in August 1896, aged 74 years. His headstone is at Elgin Cemetery (Lair H-96), Moray, Scotland.

The medal
His Victoria Cross is displayed at the Cameronians Regimental Museum, Hamilton, Lanarkshire, Scotland. The museum had bought the medal in January 1969 for the then record value of £1700.

References

Monuments to Courage (David Harvey, 1999)
The Register of the Victoria Cross (This England, 1997)
Scotland's Forgotten Valour (Graham Ross, 1995)

External links
Location of grave and VC medal (Grampian)
 

British recipients of the Victoria Cross
1822 births
1887 deaths
People from Elgin, Moray
Cameronians officers
Indian Rebellion of 1857 recipients of the Victoria Cross
British Army recipients of the Victoria Cross